The Danger Hiptop, also re-branded as the T-Mobile Sidekick, Mobiflip and Sharp Jump is a GPRS/EDGE/UMTS smartphone that was produced by Danger, Inc. from 2002 to 2010.

The Hiptop software was designed by Danger, Inc., which was located in Palo Alto, California and purchased by Microsoft for $500 million in 2008. Danger provided the Hiptop OS software and back-end services for the device. This included a catalog of downloadable software applications, email hosting, instant messaging, web proxies and a cloud service for the entire personal data on the device. The original Hiptop hardware was designed by Danger and manufactured by Flextronics. The Hiptop II, 3, Sidekick iD, Sidekick 2008 and Sidekick LX (2009) are all manufactured by Sharp Corporation in Japan and designed, respectively, by Danger and then Danger in partnership with Sharp. All versions of the Hiptop were developed in close partnership with T-Mobile, although carrier-specific features were either removed or added for each carrier, such as the addition of MMS for SunCom and Telstra Hiptop 2 users, where the feature was not available on T-Mobile USA devices until the Sidekick LX in 2007.

The Hiptop/Sidekick became incredibly popular in the U.S. and has been considered to be iconic in the mobile devices market.

Hardware and releases 
Screens on all Sidekick devices (excluding the Slide and 4G models) slide vertically to 
reveal the qwerty keyboard. There are two buttons on the left side of the device ("menu" and "jump") and also two on the right ("back" and "cancel"). On all Hiptops except the original, the left side houses a directional pad and on the right, a track ball (excluding the original Hiptop) The Hiptop 2 and Slide's directional pad contains internal multicolored LEDs used in ringers and notifications, while the 3, 2008, LX, and 2009 track ball contains internal multicolored LEDs that provide the same function.  The right side also has two phone buttons: send call (also page-down) and end call (also page-up).  The top of the unit has two application-specific shoulder buttons.  The bottom has volume controls and a power button. The Hiptop line is designed to be held horizontally with both hands, allowing typing with two thumbs, similar to a Game Boy Advance or a console video game controller.

Hiptop/T-Mobile Sidekick (Danger/Flextronics) 

Released on October 1, 2002, the original Hiptop was unique compared to all other hardware versions. All the units, from the beginning, have featured "Menu", "Back", "Jump" and other keys accessible even when the unit was closed. The Hiptop also featured a speaker which is used for device sounds but not telephone.  Along the top edge of the phone bezel is an infrared transceiver.  The headset jack serves a dual purpose, as it is also used for the accessory camera. A later revision of the Hiptop upgraded its screen from a monochrome LCD to a color LCD viewable with or without the backlight on (unique to Hiptop models until the LX). It is slightly bigger than any later Hiptop.

The Hiptop was sold by T-Mobile in the United States, United Kingdom, Germany and Austria. In the United States, its initial price was $200 and then $40 per month. SunCom and Edge Wireless used to sell the device in some parts of the United States, and Fido was the exclusive Hiptop carrier in Canada until sales were discontinued after Fido was bought by Rogers Communications, at the end of the Hiptop 2's life. The discontinuation was mainly because the Hiptop is a competitor to Rogers' BlackBerry business.

In Germany, the Hiptop service was also offered from 2003 by E-Plus which included a flat rate tariff. The Hiptop was also sold in Singapore by Starhub in 2004.

Hiptop2/T-Mobile Sidekick II (Danger/Sharp) 

Released in 2004, the Hiptop2 was introduced with Danger moving the D-Pad (directional-pad) to the left side of the Hiptop (from the inside where it was previously found), along with top-left and top-right shoulder dials, volume up/down and power on bottom of phone. The Hiptop2 also features a VGA camera, and the addition of page-up/page-down buttons on the top and bottom of its scroll wheel.  The line-by-line scrolling feature is notable to the Hiptop brand of products and is not a feature of most other multi-function cell phones. The line-by-line (ability to scroll one line at a time rather than just page by page) scrolling feature is consistent in all applications, as are the "Jump" and all other hardware buttons.

The Hiptop2 has two speakers; the phone speaker built into the D-pad, and a speaker on the back of the unit (near the VGA camera) for sounds, alerts and speaker phone calls. The microphone is located near the end-call button; on right side of the phone there is a power jack, a mini-USB port (usable only by developers, not for the general public) and hands-free headset jack.

Another important feature of the Hiptop2 is the ability to easily view the screen even without a backlight. All units until the LX model had this feature. Most other manufacturers utilized an LCD screen that was not visible without backlight. Hiptop and Palm Treo units (Treo 600 and later) utilized a transflective liquid crystal display that worked with and without the backlight, making the IM, mail, and all other messages readable even in bright sunlight, and without picking the unit up.

The dimensions of the Hiptop2 are 133 mm x 64 mm x 21 mm.

On October 9, 2006, the Australian Hiptop2 was released through Telstra.  The Australian version is practically the same as the Sidekick II in the U.S. but re-constructed for the Australian audience it has MSN Messenger built-in as the default messenger and Yahoo! Messenger which is downloadable from the catalog (the US version has Yahoo and AOL Instant Messenger).

There are also two limited edition variants of the T-Mobile USA Sidekick II: Juicy Couture Edition (Pink) and Mister Cartoon Edition (Black).  These are different case colors with the same hardware and operating systems.

Hiptop3/T-Mobile Sidekick 3 (Danger/Sharp) 

Released July 10, 2006, the Hiptop3 manufactured by Sharp was smaller than previous versions, measuring 130 mm wide x 59 mm high x 22 mm thick.  All features, including the line-by-line scroll feature remained the same. Software remained basically the same, but with the addition of more applications.

The industrial design was changed as well as a new color scheme to a dark gray shell with silver trim and gloss black buttons. The scroll wheel was replaced by a multicolor LED-lit six-direction trackball replacing the D-pad as the indicator light. The keyboard was also changed to a rigid plastic keyboard differing from the rubber keyboard of previous models known to peel away from the unit (although easily replaceable).

New features were introduced including a removable 3.7v 1500 mAh battery, a miniSD slot capable of up to 2 GB of flash memory storage, a 1.3-megapixel camera capable of 1280 x 1024 resolution, an improvement from the sub-megapixel VGA 640 x 480 camera, and a built-in 1/16" audio jack for the newly included MP3 playback software. The MiniUSB functionality was changed from allowing access to the Hiptop's internal communications to only allowing access to the MiniSD card over a USB v1.1 port. The built-in storage allows for end-users to store files for .mp3, .wav, and .aac  playback, camera, user customizable themes and other catalog application's uses.

The T-Mobile USA Sidekick 3 was made available in three limited edition models which only differed in cosmetic color changes:

 Diane von Fürstenberg — Black with pink lips; released October 30, 2006
 Lifted Research Group — Green with tree logos
 Dwyane Wade — White and gold with a basketball texture; released February 1, 2007 to coincide with the NBA All-Star Game of February 17, 2007

T-Mobile Sidekick iD (Danger/Sharp) 
The Sidekick iD is a smaller version of the Sidekick 3. It was released April 13, 2007. The Sidekick iD was aimed at younger, less affluent customers. To reduce the cost of the Sidekick iD, the creators, (Sharp), removed some of the features of the Sidekick 3, including the 1.3-megapixel camera, the Bluetooth capability, and its media player.

Although many of the "fun" features were taken out, Danger and Sharp did keep some of the features previously seen on the Sidekick 1, 2 and 3. This included the Sidekick-patented swivel screen, the hidden keyboard, and the trackball. However, a new feature were removable colored "bumpers", allowing the appearance of the Sidekick to be easily changed.

T-Mobile Sidekick LX (Danger/Sharp) 

The Sidekick LX (PV-250) was released on October 17, 2007 for existing T-Mobile customers via the Internet and five special locations. A week later, on October 24, 2007, the LX was released to new T-Mobile subscribers. The Sidekick LX is available in two different colors, Midnight Blue and Espresso Brown. In addition to the two color selections, the LX includes a wider, higher-resolution screen, blue LED mood lights on all four corners which coordinate to the user's settings, downloadable music and backgrounds, a lighter weight, MMS messaging, and a Micro SD card slot with a 128 MB card included (over the Sidekick 3's 64 MB MiniSD card), and an updated operating system. On July 16, 2008, T-Mobile released a limited edition Tony Hawk Edition Sidekick LX, which includes video recording. Despite production models being made for testing, ultimately the LX was never released in Australia due to a lack of compatibility with Telstra's 3G 850Mhz network, however Telstra went ahead with selling the Slide after the Hiptop3; the Hiptop3 is now phased out. A Midnight Blue Sidekick LX was featured in the video game Midnight Club: Los Angeles.

In late 2010, Mobilicity began selling the Sidekick LX 2009 as the Mobiflip. In early 2011, US regional carrier Cincinnati Bell began selling the Sidekick LX 2009 as the Sharp Jump.

Motorola Q700 (Sidekick Slide) (Danger/Motorola) 

In Australia it is marketed as the Hiptop Slide and in the U.S. as the Sidekick Slide. It was first released on November 5, 2007, through Telstra in Australia. T-Mobile USA release followed two days later, on November 7, 2007. It was later released in the UK and Germany by T-Mobile (as opposed to the Sidekick LX only being released by T-Mobile USA). The Sidekick/Hiptop Slide offers the same features and services as every other Danger device and an update to Danger's latest OS version (4.0). Like the LX, this Sidekick for T-Mobile USA adds the Multimedia Messaging application and provides support for T-Mobile MyFaves plans.

The T-Mobile Sidekick Slide, although less expensive than the LX, provides various hardware upgrades. These upgrades include 128 MB RAM and 225 MHz TI OMAP 850 processor, as opposed to the Sidekick 3 and LX's 64 MB RAM and 200 MHz OMAP 331 processor, and a second speaker which is located on the back of the device, as opposed to the Hiptop 3 and LX's reliance on the D-pad speaker for both calls and music playback.

T-Mobile USA suspended sales of the Sidekick Slide on Friday evening, November 16, 2007, after Motorola confirmed that some devices inadvertently powered off when the slide door on the front side of the phone was opened or closed. Sidekick Slide owners that reported the power issue received a free exchange to a blue Sidekick LX with free express shipping.

On November 21, 2007, Motorola stated the failures were triggered by poor battery contacts; sliding the screen out to type on the keyboard sometimes loosened the contact and forced the device to shut off momentarily.

On December 6, 2007, the Sidekick Slide was once again available for purchase.

On May 16, 2008, a new version of the Sidekick Slide was released, named the Sidekick Slide Scarlet.

The Sidekick Slide was officially discontinued on August 8, 2008. It was available for sale again on December 12, 2008, however, T-Mobile has once again discontinued the Sidekick Slide.

On October 1, 2009, Telstra officially discontinued the Hiptop service plans and phones. All remaining customers who contracts are still under contract are not affected, however the service and phone is no longer available for sale, and will not be offered for sale again.

T-Mobile Sidekick 2008 (Danger/Sharp) 
On August 1, 2008 T-Mobile released the Sidekick 2008 right before the Slide was discontinued. This has improved features such as a high resolution 2-megapixel camera and video functionality high quality AIM. It also went back to the swivel Qwerty design, including changeable face/backplates. The Sidekick 2008 is available only in certain T-mobile stores. The Sidekick 2008 features were reviewed by gizmodo, PC Magazine and in a cnet video review.

T-Mobile Sidekick LX 2009 (Danger/Sharp) 
The 2009 edition of the Sidekick LX (PV-300), which was known during the development phase as the "Sidekick Blade" or the "Sidekick 2009", was released on May 13, 2009, after a pre-order period beginning on April 17.

The new handset supports 3G and HSDPA, and makes various changes to the hardware, including a 3.2 inch F-WVGA display with 854×480 resolution and a 3.2-megapixel camera with autofocus and flash. However, most of the known changes involve software and improved functionality for social networking applications. Support for Facebook, Twitter and MySpace is now native to the system, allowing the handset to pass along notifications in the status bar as it does with instant messaging, e-mail and so forth. YouTube streaming playback is also supported on the system through Flash Lite.

The Sidekick LX 2009 offered synchronization with Microsoft Outlook and Microsoft Exchange, through a download via the applications catalog. The highest-profile addition to the handset was Bing (then called "Live Search"), was added and integrated with the new GPS functionality; the mapping software previously relied on cell-tower triangulation (a far less accurate process). The application included turn-by-turn navigation.

Danger platform discontinuation 
T-Mobile announced on July 2, 2010, that the Sidekick LX 09 and Sidekick 2008 would no longer be available through T-Mobile.
Danger notified its development community via their Danger Developer Zone forums that it would no longer accept submissions for its application store, called the Catalog, on September 21, 2010. The development of applications for the Sidekick platform was also halted on September 21, 2010.
This was followed by the closure of the Danger Developer Zone forums and related archives September 30, 2010. However the Canadian company Mobilicity later began selling the Sidekick LX (2009) under the name Mobiflip.

Mobilicity Mobiflip / Sharp Jump / Sharp PV300GR (Sharp) 
While the T-Mobile Sidekick LX 2009 was no longer sold from July 2, 2010 onwards, modified versions of the device have been available for sale since. In Canada, carrier Mobilicity began selling the device under the name "Mobiflip" and the model number PV300G in late December 2010. In the United States, regional carrier Cincinnati Bell began selling the "Sharp Jump", model number PV300GC, in early 2011. Both devices have a modified version of the Danger OS installed, although any mention of Danger has been removed. This modified OS is independent of any backend service, and the original Danger Web browser, Instant Messaging and Email applications have been removed. The Web browser was replaced with Opera Mini whereas the Instant Messaging clients were replaced with one universal client which also allows the user to connect to an IM service through an XMPP server. There is no email client installed, and there is no Catalog service available.

The Mobiflip can be unlocked for voice service worldwide, but will not work for data due to the lack of an option to change the network APN. The Sharp Jump is different as it is possible to change the network APN, and will work with voice and data anywhere in the world provided the phone is unlocked and a compatible GSM or UMTS network is available.

T-Mobile Sidekick 4G (Android/Samsung) 

In April 2011, T-Mobile revived the Sidekick brand for a new 4G HSPA+-compatible Android smartphone developed by Samsung, known as the Sidekick 4G, based on the Galaxy S. It incorporates features from the original series, including the keyboard, 3.2-megapixel camera (minus LED flash), and the four-button layout, and adds a new Android-powered interface incorporating elements from the Hiptop's operating system. It should not be confused for a Danger device, to which these have no relation other than the T-Mobile exclusive "Sidekick" branding.

Software 

The Hiptop operating system, referred to as DangerOS, is one of the only Java-based operating systems. Even the device drivers were developed in Java. A large part of DangerOS's architecture was used later to create the Android operating system. For Hiptop development, Danger has its own proprietary APIs, which are a subset of J2SE with their own extensions. Danger introduced support for Java ME, the Java language optimized for mobile devices, to its OS with the release of OS 2.3.

Each Sidekick had an IM client (with AIM, Yahoo Messenger, and MSN Messenger); an Email client with an included T-Mail account; a pre-installed game (Rockets and Rocks or Bob's Journey); an organizer with planner, a calendar, and calculator; an SMS and phone app; a Download Fun catalog (also called Catalog on Hiptop devices); and later devices had a variety of social network apps accessed from a section called Communities. Devices released in Europe also had a WAP browser (Wapaka) developed by the French company Digital Airways.

A cloud service backed up all personal data like settings, planner, notes, calendar, photos and all contacts. It was accessible and also editable on a web interface. A factory reset or new device was able to restore all personal data by signing in with username and password.

To aid third-party software design, Danger released a comprehensive software development kit (SDK) that contained a Hiptop simulator, development installation utilities, and Danger API information. The SDK was available without charge from Danger's development website.

There was no way to add applications to the standard Hiptop software on the device without the use of the Catalog.

Application developers can bypass this functionality by using the included programs in the Danger Hiptop SDK to install user-written applications to the Hiptop device directly.  To do this, you had to apply for a special software key known as a Danger Developer Key. The Danger Developer Key is a special security certificate that is provided by Danger that enables the device to be used as a Development Device.  This will allow the installation of user-written applications to the device, but will void any software warranty provided by Danger and/or your wireless carrier. Any applicable hardware warranties should still apply.

While DangerOS uses .jar files for applications, they are uploaded to the device in special files called "bundles". Bundle files have the extension '.bndl'. Each bundle file is linked to a specific operating system version and build number.  For example, a bundle file for v3.4/155053 (T-Mobile Sidekick 3) would be denied installation on a v3.3/149695 device (T-Mobile Sidekick iD).  Installation of bundles require a developer key to be installed on your device if you are using a Production OS. Internal OS builds do not require developer keys.

The Sidekick LX 2009 model runs DangerOS 5.0 which is based on NetBSD.

2009 data service outage 

On October 2, 2009, Microsoft (the owner of Danger, Inc.) lost the ability to access user data for T-Mobile US Sidekick subscribers temporarily. Subscriber data loss included contacts, notes, calendars and photos. Some data was restored within 14 days of the outage, but most of the data was restored between October 8 and the end of November. Early reports stating T-Mobile and Microsoft had lost all customer data as a result of a server failure at Microsoft proved to be untrue.

Sidekick user data is stored at Danger facilities, under the ownership of Microsoft. Unsubstantiated reports suggest Microsoft vendor Hitachi, Danger's storage area network (SAN) provider may have had a part in the temporary data loss. Lawsuits against Microsoft claim that Microsoft had inadequate backups or an insufficient disaster recovery plan. A litigation against Microsoft and others was settled in 2011.

As a result of the outage, T-Mobile suspended sales of all Sidekicks and Sidekick Data Plans until the outage was resolved.  Sales and new activations resumed on November 16, 2009.

Danger cloud service discontinuation 
On February 28, 2011 Engadget reported Microsoft would discontinue Danger's cloud service on May 31, 2011. After that date, Sidekicks no longer had access to any data services, though voice service still functioned.

In Australia, the Telstra Hiptop service was continued for existing customers after May 31, 2011, when the T-Mobile USA Sidekick service was shut down. Then, it was announced that the Hiptop service for Telstra customers was to be discontinued on October 4, 2011. Selected affected customers received a free Samsung Galaxy 551 to replace their Hiptop devices. After the Telstra shutdown, no known carriers worldwide offered any form of Danger data service.

Usage by the deaf and hard-of-hearing 
When the Hiptop/T-Mobile Sidekick was initially released in late 2002, it was the only cellular phone to factory integrate an instant messaging client, specifically AOL Instant Messenger. This text-based communications medium, along with on-device email and a full QWERTY keyboard, made it popular with the deaf community, providing a telecommunications tool for use both inside and outside the home. Almost immediately it began replacing the dominant wireless devices used by the Deaf at that time, namely the Motorola T-900, PageWriter, and TimePort, as well as the early RIM and BlackBerry e-mail pagers manufactured by Research In Motion.

The Hiptop/T-Mobile Sidekick's importance to the Deaf was further solidified in March 2003 when it became the first cellular phone capable of placing unassisted TDD and Relay Operator calls through the phone's web browser using a system developed by Jon B. Sharpe at Lormar Logic Company. Lormar Logic enhanced the TDD/Relay Operator system in August 2003 by developing a means for the deaf to place calls through AOL Instant Messenger.

MCI Relay followed two months later with a Relay Operator system accessible through telnet. MCI Relay and Hamilton Relay both released AOL Instant Messenger relay systems in July of the following year. By 2005, at least four Relay Operator providers (Hamilton, MCI, Sprint, Sorenson, and i711) were providing direct Relay Operator access from the Sidekick using either one of the instant messenger clients or through a free download from the Catalog, and two companies (Lormar Logic and i711) were providing direct TDD access. The software for these is provided at no additional charge in addition to the normal data plan. The free Lormar Logic service also provides the Deaf with direct encrypted calling to the United States Social Security Administration and the Internal Revenue Service. The i711 client provides extra services to the Deaf at an additional fee (such as AAA roadside services, and finding Open Captioned movies, etc.).

Access to direct TDD and relay operator communications has allowed the Hiptop/T-Mobile Sidekick and similar devices to, in many cases, replace the use of standard TDD machines, and its dominance is clearly illustrated by the evolution of its own sign in American Sign Language, made using both hands to mimic the opening of the rotating screen.

T-Mobile's decision to offer a "data only" wireless plan, thereby eliminating charges for unusable voice minutes, also played a role in the device's dominance in the deaf community. Additionally, some local deaf non-profit groups in the U.S. will either pay all or part of the cost of the device/monthly service fees for the user to keep them "connected". Other groups have set up discount programs, where Deaf users receive a discount on the cost of the device and monthly service fee based on the number of members in the group.

See also 
 EnV
 Helio Ocean
 HTC Dream
 HTC Touch Pro2
 HTC Wizard
 iPhone
 Microsoft KIN
 Mylo
 N-Gage (device)
 Ogo
 Palm Pixi
 Pogo

References

External links 

 T-Mobile Sidekick
 Danger, Inc.
 Danger-sponsored Website & Forums

Mobile phones introduced in 2002
Products and services discontinued in 2010
Deutsche Telekom
Personal digital assistants
Mobile phones with an integrated hardware keyboard
Sharp Corporation mobile phones
Motorola mobile phones
Samsung mobile phones
Discontinued smartphones
Slider phones